The Dammbach is a river in Bavaria, Germany. It flows into the Elsava near the village Dammbach.

See also
List of rivers of Bavaria

References

Rivers of Bavaria
Rivers of the Spessart
Rivers of Germany